Francisco Teocharis Papaiordanou Filho, commonly known as Fran (born 5 May 1992), is a Brazilian footballer who plays for Corinthians B as an attacking midfielder.

Career
Born in São Paulo, Fran played graduated from Corinthians' youth system, and was subsequently loaned to Guaratinguetá in July 2011. He played his first match as a professional on 19 November, playing the last 28 minutes of a 2–1 home success against Vila Nova for the Série B championship.

On 13 December 2012 Fran rescinded his link with Timão and moved to Paulista. After making no appearances for the latter he joined XV de Piracicaba, playing with the club in Copa Paulista.

In late July 2013 Fran was loaned to Grêmio Barueri until November. In 2014, he joined Grêmio Osasco, and after appearing regularly he moved to Portuguesa on 7 July 2014.

References

External links

1992 births
Living people
Footballers from São Paulo
Brazilian footballers
Association football midfielders
Campeonato Brasileiro Série B players
Campeonato Brasileiro Série C players
Sport Club Corinthians Paulista players
Guaratinguetá Futebol players
Paulista Futebol Clube players
Esporte Clube XV de Novembro (Piracicaba) players
Grêmio Barueri Futebol players
Grêmio Osasco Audax Esporte Clube players
Associação Portuguesa de Desportos players
Nacional Atlético Clube (SP) players
Associação Atlética Flamengo players
Clube Atlético Juventus players
Esporte Clube Noroeste players